Nicolas Ezequiel Roldan (born December 4, 1982) is an American polo player and model.

Biography

Early life
He was born in Buenos Aires, Argentina. His father, Raul Roldan, is a polo player who played with the Sultan of Brunei, as was his grandfather. His mother is Dee Roldan, an interior designer. He has a sister, Lupe Roldan. He grew up in Wellington, Florida. He started playing polo at the age of five. He graduated from Cardinal Newman High School in West Palm Beach, Florida.

Polo career
He is an eight-goal polo player. He owns thirty polo ponies. Nic also retrains off the track Thoroughbred horses (OTTBs) to use as polo ponies. 

In 1998, at the age of fifteen, the Escue team he played on, together with Sebastien Merlos, Juan I. Merlos and Stuart Erskine, won the U.S. Open Polo Championship. The following year, in 1999, he was named polo's Young Player of the Year.

In 2010, he was captain on the polo team of Prince Harry at the Veuve Clicquot Polo Classic on Governors Island.

On July 28, 2013, Equus & Co sponsored United States team he played on, together with Polito Pieres, Marc Ganzi and Mike Azzaro, lost the Westchester Cup in overtime.

Modeling career
He has been a model for Wilhelmina Models. He has also represented Piaget SA, the watch-maker. He also appeared on Kourtney and Kim Take Miami, where he taught polo to Kourtney Kardashian and Kim Kardashian.

Personal life
He has six tattoos.

References

External links 
 Official Website
 Nic Roldan on Twitter

People from Buenos Aires
People from Wellington, Florida
American polo players
1982 births
Living people